John Paul Riddle (May 19, 1901 – April 6, 1989) was an American pilot and aviation pioneer, best known for training Allied air crews in WW2 and co-founding what later became Embry-Riddle Aeronautical University (ERAU).

Personal life 
Born on May 19, 1901 in Pikeville, Kentucky. After graduating from Pikeville College, he entered the Naval Academy, but left after a year because he wanted to fly airplanes, which he learned to do with the US Army Air Service in Texas after first learning to overhaul plane engines, allowing him to fulfill his boyhood dream of becoming a barnstormer, flying cross country giving rides to people at fairs, having girls write messages on the wings of his Jenny, the plane he loved best. 

As a young man Paul Riddle was married to and divorced from an opera singer named Grace, whose last name is lost in time, perhaps because they had no children. In 1948 he married Adele Goeser and her four children. They had two more children and were divorced in 1969, but ended up as friends living in the same house in Coral Gables, Florida where aged 87 Riddle came down with an illness and died in his sleep a few days later, April 6, 1989.
 His ashes were scattered over the Atlantic. And he's remembered by a marker at Oak Ridge Cemetery in Arcadia, Florida, surrounded by the honored graves of RAF cadets who died learning to fly.

Embry-Riddle 
On December 17, 1925, exactly 22 years after the Wright Brothers' first flight, Riddle and T. Higbee Embry formed the Embry-Riddle Company at Lunken Airport in Cincinnati, Ohio. Riddle had met Embry two years prior, while Riddle was barnstorming in Ohio. He had landed at a polo field, offered Embry a ride in his plane, and from then on they were good friends. Riddle was named general manager, and the two began to sell Waco Aircraft in Cincinnati. In spring of 1926, the Embry-Riddle Company opened the Embry-Riddle Flying School. The school grew rapidly in 1928 and 1929, until the Embry-Riddle Company (now the Embry-Riddle Aviation Corporation) was merged with the Aviation Corporation (AVCO) of Delaware. AVCO phased out the Embry-Riddle Flying School in the fall of 1930. Shortly after, AVCO became American Airways (the predecessor of American Airlines), and the Embry-Riddle Company was gone.

In 1939, Riddle was ready to get back into the business of training pilots. He contacted Embry, who had no interest in reentering a partnership with Riddle. Riddle, now living in Miami, Florida, found a partner in John G. McKay and his wife, Isabel. Keeping the Embry-Riddle name, they reestablished the Embry-Riddle School of Aviation (now the Embry-Riddle Aeronautical University), partnering with the University of Miami to provide flight training under the Civilian Pilot Training Program, increasing the number of pilots immediately proceeding World War II. Riddle and McKay also formed the Riddle Aeronautical Institute at Carlstrom Field in Arcadia, Florida on March 22, 1941 for the purpose of training pilots for the United States Army Air Corps. A separate division of Embry-Riddle provided technical training in maintenance and metal work.

McKay purchased Riddle's share of Embry-Riddle in 1944 and from then on the two co-founders of the original Embry-Riddle were no longer involved.

Other companies 
Riddle also founded many other aviation related companies and schools. The J.P. Riddle Company was a school founded in 1939. The flying and technical school was so large that it contracted five flying schools to the US and British governments. A Brazilian school, Escola Tecnica de Aviacao, was established in 1943 and was located in Sao Paulo, Brazil. In May 1945, J.P. Riddle Company used some aircraft to relocate American transport instructors to his school in Brazil. This regularly scheduled service was operated by Riddle Airlines, which was incorporated by Riddle.

Use of Riddle's name 
 The call sign for aircraft at both ERAU campuses use the phrase "Riddle" followed by the numbers (two at the Prescott campus) in its registration. This call sign can only be used in the local area, as it is under an agreement with local air traffic control.
 The John Paul Riddle Society is a gift society at Embry-Riddle reserved for those who have donated more than $500,000 to the University.
 Before its current name, Airglades Airport in Clewiston, Florida was known as Riddle Field.

Awards 
 Wesley L. McDonald Elder Statesman Award (1986)
 Pikeville College Outstanding Alumni Award (1988)
 Florida Aviation Hall of Fame

See also 
 Embry-Riddle Aeronautical University

References

External links 
 Embry-Riddle Aeronautical University
 The John Paul Riddle Society

1901 births
1989 deaths
Aviators from Kentucky
United States Army Air Forces soldiers
University of Pikeville alumni
United States Naval Academy alumni
People from Coral Gables, Florida
People from Pikeville, Kentucky
Military personnel from Kentucky
Embry–Riddle Aeronautical University